Transitionalisms is the six-song EP by The Nein, released through Sonic Unyon Records in 2006.

Track listing
All songs written and composed by The Nein, except where noted.

 "Butcher's Tale" (The Zombies) – 3:31
 "Transitionalisthmus" – 0:38
 "Hospital Television" – 4:39
 "Sexy Beast" – 3:15
 "The Vibe (Crash's Bleeder Remix)" – 2:43
 "Convalescent Homes" – 2:18

Personnel

The Nein
 Finn Cohen – Vocals, guitar
 Casey Burns – bass
 Robert Biggers – drum, keyboards
 Dale Flattum – ???
 Josh Carpenter – ???

Production
 Nick Peterson – Engineering, mixing
 Jayce Murphy – Engineering
 Crash – Remixing
 Finn Cohen – Programming
 Casey Burns – graphic design

References

External links

Transitionalisms at Rate Your Music
Sonic Unyon's website

2006 EPs
Sonic Unyon Records EPs